The General William Grose House is a historic home located at 614 S. 14th St., New Castle, Henry County, Indiana.  It is the home of the Henry County Historical Society.  The Italianate mansion was built in 1870 by Civil War Major General William Grose and his wife Rebecca. General Grose commanded the 36th Indiana Regiment and fought in the battles at Vicksburg, Chattanooga, Chickmauga and Atlanta. He resided in the house until his death in 1900. The Henry County Historical Society acquired the 16 room mansion in 1902 and operates it as a museum.

It was added to the National Register of Historic Places in 1983.

References

External links
Article about the museum and the Henry County Historical Society

New Castle, Indiana
Houses on the National Register of Historic Places in Indiana
Houses completed in 1870
Houses in Henry County, Indiana
National Register of Historic Places in Henry County, Indiana
Italianate architecture in Indiana
Museums in Henry County, Indiana
Former houses in the United States
History museums in Indiana